The Progressive Labour Federation 47 (C-47) is a trade union federation in Suriname. It is affiliated with the International Trade Union Confederation.

References

Trade unions in Suriname
International Trade Union Confederation